Huang Shih-chung (born 29 March 1979) is a former badminton player from the Republic of China. He was the silver medalist at the 1996 World Junior Championships in the boys' doubles event partnered with Chien Yu-hsiu. In the senior international tournament, he firstly took the podium as a men's doubles runner-up at the 1997 Spanish International. At the IBF Grand Prix tournament, he was the semifinalists at the 2002 U.S. Open and 2004 Thailand Open. He also participated at the World Championships in 1997, 1999, 2001, 2005 and in 2006. Huang occupied the men's doubles title at the 2006 Victorian International alongside Chien Yu-hsun. Educated at the National Taiwan Sport University, he won the men's doubles gold at the 1998, 2000, and 2006 World University Championships, also the mixed and men's doubles silver in 1998 and 2002 respectively. He was part of the national men's team that clinched the bronze medal at the 1997 East Asian Games and Asia Cup.

Achievements

World Junior Championships 
Boys' doubles

IBF International 
Men's doubles

References

External links 
 

1979 births
Living people
Taiwanese male badminton players
20th-century Taiwanese people